2005 World Junior Championships may refer to:

 Figure skating: 2005 World Junior Figure Skating Championships
 Ice hockey: 2005 World Junior Ice Hockey Championships
 Motorcycle speedway:
 2005 Individual Speedway Junior World Championship
 2005 Team Speedway Junior World Championship

See also
 2005 World Cup (disambiguation)
 2005 Continental Championships (disambiguation)
 2005 World Championships (disambiguation)